Kuvempu Nagar is a residential layout in Mysore, Karnataka, India.

See also
 Ramakrishna Nagar
 Akshaya Bhandar
 Manantahavady Road
 Srirampur
 Mysore South

References

External links

Mysore South
Suburbs of Mysore